Little Friend may refer to:

 The Little Friend (Marshall novel), a 1929 novel by Bruce Marshall
 The Little Friend, a 2002 novel by Donna Tartt
 Little Friend (film), a 1934 British film
Little Friends: Dogs & Cats, a pet simulation video game for the Nintendo Switch
"Little Friend", a song by Nickelback from the album Curb, 1996